Peter Johnston (born 1 June 1960) is a former professional tennis player from Australia.

Career
Johnston played collegiate tennis for Oklahoma State University.

He received a bye in the opening round of the 1982 Australian Open, then faced Ben Testerman in the second round, a match the Australian lost in straight sets. In the doubles he made the third round, with partner John McCurdy.

Johnston is believed to be one of the inspirations (alongside Stefan Edberg) for the Australian Open logo from 1995 to 2016, which depicted a male player serving.

He now works a managing director at the Women's Tennis Association.

Grand Prix/WCT career finals

Doubles: 1 (0–1)

Challenger titles

Doubles: (1)

References

1960 births
Living people
Australian male tennis players
Tennis people from Victoria (Australia)
Oklahoma State Cowboys tennis players
20th-century Australian people
21st-century Australian people